This is the full table of the medal table of the 1948 Winter Olympics, which were held in St. Moritz, Switzerland. These rankings sort by the number of gold medals earned by a country. The number of silvers is taken into consideration next and then the number of bronze. If, after the above, countries are still tied, equal ranking is given and they are listed alphabetically. This follows the system used by the IOC, IAAF and BBC. Medals for the two demonstration sports Military patrol and Winter pentathlon are not included in this summary, albeit they are listed in the official report of the Swiss Olympic Committee. Italy won its first Winter Olympic medal, a gold medal.

See also
List of 1948 Winter Olympics medal winners

References

External links
 
 
 

Medal table
1948